Photosensitive drug reaction secondary to medications may cause phototoxic, photoallergic, and lichenoid reactions, and photodistributed telangiectasias, as well as pseudoporphyria.

Drugs involved include naproxen and doxycycline.

See also
Skin lesion
List of cutaneous conditions

References

External links 

 
Drug eruptions